KEAO-LP (91.5 FM) was a radio station licensed to Wailuku, Hawaii, United States, serving some limited parts of the Hawaiian island of Maui. The station's license was cancelled June 25, 2013. Although actual Hawaiian music was rare, such genres as jazz, blues, acoustic and world music were common. Mana'O Radio did have a live-streaming web page. The station was owned by Mana'o Radio.

References

External links
 

Defunct radio stations in the United States
Radio stations disestablished in 2013
EAO-LP
EAO-LP
2013 disestablishments in Hawaii
EAO-LP